Brisinga is a genus of starfish in the family Brisingidae. The species in this genus are primarily found in deep sea habitats.

Species
Brisinga Asbjørnsen, 1856
Brisinga alberti Fisher, 1907
 Brisinga analoga (Fisher, 1919)
 Brisinga andamanica Wood-Mason & Alcock, 1891
 Brisinga bengalensis Wood-Mason & Alcock, 1891
 Brisinga chathamica McKnight, 1973
 Brisinga costata Verrill, 1884
 Brisinga cricophora Sladen, 1889
 Brisinga distincta Sladen, 1889
 Brisinga endecacnemos Asbjørnsen, 1856
 Brisinga eucoryne Fisher, 1916
 Brisinga evermanni Fisher, 1906
 Brisinga gunnii Alcock, 1893
 Brisinga hirsuta Perrier, 1894
 Brisinga insularum Wood-Mason & Alcock, 1891
 Brisinga panopla Fisher, 1906
 Brisinga parallela Koehler, 1909
 Brisinga synaptoma (Fisher, 1917)
 Brisinga tasmani H.E.S. Clark, 1970
 Brisinga trachydisca Fisher, 1916
 Brisinga variispina Ludwig, 1905

References

Brisingida
Animals described in 1856